The Adventures of T-Rex (T-レックス (T-rekkusu)) is an animated TV series that aired in syndication from 1992 to 1993 in North America. The show features five musical Tyrannosaurus brothers who played to sold-out crowds as a vaudeville group for the Dragon company. The company was owned by the beautiful and wealthy Myrna. The band members were also secretly fighting crime as "T-REX," masterminded by Professor Edison. The show, an American/Japanese coproduction between C&D (Créativité et Développement), Gunther-Wahl Productions and well-known anime producer Kitty Film, lasted only one season.

Plot
Set in a world of anthropomorphic dinosaurs, brothers Bernie (blue), Bruno (pink), Bubba (green), Buck (yellow) and Bugsy (purple) were born with special powers to help fight crime. Each brother's special power was related to a specific part of their anatomy; Bernie's legs, Bruno's arms, Bubba's tail, Buck's mouth and teeth, and Bugsy's telekinetic eyes. In the day, they make up a singing group that perform at the Dragon Company in Rep City. The group rode out on their Rexmobile to battle "Big Boss" Graves, crime kingpin of Rep City, and his evil organization The Corporation which also consists of Little Boss, Adder, Madder, Shooter, Cuddles, Axe, and the Doctor. Kid sister Ginger was part of the singing group, but didn't know about her brothers' secret identities.

One of the show's other noteworthy elements was giving the T-Rexes imitation celebrity voices: Jack Benny, Art Carney, Bing Crosby, Humphrey Bogart and Jimmy Durante.

Voice cast
 Kathleen Barr - Flo, Myrna, Black Widow
 Michael Beattie - Buck, Delaney
 Garry Chalk - Bruno, Madder, Mayor Maynot
 Michael Donovan - Professor Edison, Shooter, Big Dinosaur
 Ian James Corlett - Bugsy, Waldo Winch
 Phil Hayes - Little Boss, Axe
 Scott McNeil - Bubba, Adder
 Robert O. Smith - Bernie, Cuddles, Dr. Death
 Venus Terzo - Ginger, Mae
 Dale Wilson - Big Boss Graves, Bissell

Additional voices
 Jennifer Copping
 Brian Dobson
 Janyse Jaud
 Alessandro Juliani
 Annabel Kershaw
 Michael Dobson

Episode list

Credits
 Created by
Michael Wahl, Lee Gunther
 Developed by
Michael Wahl, Lee Gunther, Jean Chalopin
 Original Character Designs by
Satoru Tsuda
 Executive Producers
Michael Wahl, Lee Gunther, Jean Chalopin, Hidenori Taga
 Co-Executive Producer
Mark Taylor Zahra Dowlatabadi 
 Producers
Rudy J. Zamura, Xavier Picard, Shigekazu Ochiai
 Creative Consultant
Takashi
 Teleplay by
Jean Chalopin
 Story Editor
Peter Lawrence
 Directed by
Stephane Martinere
 Voice Direction
Michael Donovan
 Talent Coordinator
Gail Hackery
 Liaison to Kitty
Gene Pelc
 Overseas Production Supervisor
Toshiyuki Hiruma
 Art Director
Charlie Sansonetti
 Characters and Props
Francois Capuron, Didier Cassegrain, Laurent Duvault, Pascall Morelli, Michele Perbet
 Background Designers
Max Braslavsky, Vincent Gassies, Bruno Julier, Florence Nizan, Luc Paulet
 Storyboards
Remi Brenot, Boyd Kirkland Vic Dal Chele, Richard Danto, Adrian Gonzalez, Georges Grammat, Gordon Harrison Rick Hoberg Dave Jenkins Larry Latham, Philippe Landrot, Pascall Morelli, Ruben Negri, Pascal Pinon
 Storyboard Review
Eric McConnell Saburo Hashimoto 
 Color Background Artists
Jean-Claude Bauer, Anne-Cecile de Rumine, Benedicte Fages, Genevieve, Penloup, Vincent Gassies
 Color Key Artists
Claude Morelli, Isa Python, Genevieve Penloup, Maryann Stewart
 Associate Producers
Karen Malach, Robert Winthrop
 Production Coordinators
Monica Arce, Saiid Assefi, Claudia Ellis, Jill Gray, Kazumi Sawaguchi, Gaetano Vaccaro, Frank Weiss
 Production Secretary
Samia De Jema
 Animation Production
KK C&D Asia, AKOM Productions Company, Wang Film Productions Company Shigeru Akagawa, Hiroshi Toita, Hiroshi Saotome, Kitty Film
 Animation Supervisors
Masanori Miura, Kazuyuki Hirokawa, Masakazu Higuchi, Eiji Okabe
 Layouts
Group Zen, Anime-Spot Co. Ltd, AD Cosmo Inc., Teleimage Japan Inc.
 Animation Studios
Mad House, Philippe Animation Studio Inc., Mook Company Ltd, Samile Animation Co. Ltd, Hung Long Animation Co. Ltd
 Animation Producer
Takahiko Tsuchiya
 Editorial Services
Broughten-Winicki Inc.
 Slugging & Sheet Direction
Pretend Production
 Original Music by
Robert J. Walsh
 Music Editor
Jeffrey R. King
 Sound Effects & Mix by
Dick and Rogers Sound Studio Ltd, Fury and Grace
 Post Production Supervisor
Yannick Heude
 Audio Supervisor
Jacques Siegel
 Video Supervisor
Jean-Marc Fonseca
 Post Production Coordinators
Aban Patel, Suzanne Remiot

See also
List of anthropomorphic animal superheroes

References

External links

T-REX- Satoru Tsuda's Site

1990s American animated television series
1992 American television series debuts
1993 American television series endings
American children's animated adventure television series
Animal superheroes
Animated television series about dinosaurs
English-language television shows
Television series created by Jean Chalopin
Television series by Saban Entertainment